Meerhoven is a city quarter in the Dutch city of Eindhoven. It is the newest quarter of the city and a Vinex-location, which has been under development since 1997.

The development of Meerhoven was started to deal with the shortage of housing in Eindhoven in the 1990s (and it was also part of the general Vinex urban development projects started around that time). In order to facilitate growth of the city, a significant rezoning of the southeast of the province of North Brabant was undertaken, in which part of the territory of the town of Veldhoven was added to Eindhoven. Also, the local airport Welschap was moved west and renamed Eindhoven Airport. The Meerhoven project was then started to develop the now vacated and available land. A large tract of the Meerhoven area was formerly the PIROC terrain (Pantser Infanterie RijOpleidingsCentrum, English Armored Infantry Drivers Training Center).

Meerhoven is located on the northwestern part of Eindhoven (north of the current territory of Veldhoven) and spans the Eindhoven territory west of the A2 motorway. The quarter is part of the district of Strijp. As of 1 January 2010 the quarter houses 8640 people, which is expected to grow to 12.000 upon completion of the entire development project.

The term "Meerhoven" is often used to refer to the residential parts of the quarter, i.e., the neighborhoods Bosrijk, Grasrijk, Meerrijk, Waterrijk en Zandrijk. However, Meerhoven also includes the industrial areas Flight en Park Forum, Nimbus, Land Forum and Trade Forum, as well as the land of Eindhoven Airport. Moreover, the area known as BeA2, the Meerbos and the Golfclub Welschap are part of Meerhoven.

Before the actual building started, a lot of time was spent thoroughly searching the grounds for leftover explosives from World War II, which are found in the area regularly.

External links 
 Municipal information on Meerhoven
 Meerhoven website
 Statistics website of Eindhoven

Neighbourhoods of Eindhoven